{{DISPLAYTITLE:Omicron1 Eridani}}

Omicron1 Eridani (ο1 Eridani, abbreviated Omicron1 Eri, ο1 Eri), also named Beid , is a variable star in the constellation of Eridanus. With an average apparent visual magnitude of 4.04, it is visible to the naked eye on a clear, dark night. Based upon parallax measurements, it lies approximately 122 light-years from the Sun.

Nomenclature

ο1 Eridani (Latinised to Omicron1 Eridani) is the star's Bayer designation.

The system bears the traditional name Beid derived from the Arabic word   بيض  meaning "eggs" (cf. neighboring Keid "(egg)shells"). 
In 2016, the International Astronomical Union organized a Working Group on Star Names (WGSN) to catalogue and standardize proper names for stars. The WGSN approved the name Beid for this star on 12 September 2016 and it is now so included in the List of IAU-approved Star Names.

Properties 

Omicron1 Eridani is an evolved F-type giant star with a stellar classification of F0 III. It is a Delta Scuti variable star that undergoes non-radial pulsations, with a variation of just 0.03 magnitude over a period of 0.0747 days. The star is spinning rapidly with a projected rotational velocity of 108.1 km/s and a rotation period of less than around 1.9 days. This is creating an equatorial bulge that is 11% wider than the polar radius. Omicron1 Eridani has nearly double the mass of the Sun, 3.7 times the Sun's radius, and shines with 27 times the solar luminosity from an outer atmosphere at an effective temperature of 6,963 K.

References

External links

F-type giants
Delta Scuti variables
Eridanus (constellation)
Beid
Eridani, Omicron1
Eridani, 38
026574
019587
1298
Durchmusterung objects